Rita Coolidge (born May 1, 1945) is an American recording artist. During the 1970s and 1980s, her songs were on Billboard magazine's pop, country, adult contemporary, and jazz charts, and she won two Grammy Awards with fellow musician and then-husband Kris Kristofferson. Her recordings include "(Your Love Keeps Lifting Me) Higher and Higher," "We're All Alone", "I'd Rather Leave While I'm in Love",	and the theme song for the 1983 James Bond film Octopussy: "All Time High".

Life and career

Early life 
Coolidge was born in Lafayette, Tennessee. She is the daughter of Dick and Charlotte Coolidge, a minister and schoolteacher, with sisters Linda and Priscilla, and brother Raymond. She is of Cherokee and Scottish ancestry. She attended Nashville's Maplewood High School and graduated from Andrew Jackson Senior High School in Jacksonville, Florida. Coolidge is a graduate of Florida State University. She is a member of Alpha Gamma Delta sorority.

Early career 
After singing around Memphis (including a stint singing jingles), Coolidge was discovered by Delaney & Bonnie, who worked with her in Los Angeles. There, she became a backing singer for artists including Leon Russell, Joe Cocker, Harry Chapin, Bob Dylan, Jimi Hendrix, Eric Clapton, Dave Mason, Graham Nash, and Stephen Stills. She was featured in Joe Cocker's Mad Dogs and Englishmen tour and album, singing Russell's and Bonnie Bramlett's song "Superstar". Coolidge did not receive songwriting credits for "Superstar" which later became a hit for The Carpenters.

She became known as "The Delta Lady" and inspired Russell to write a song of the same name for her.

"Layla"
Coolidge didn't receive songwriting credits for the coda in the 1971 single "Layla" by Eric Clapton's band Derek and the Dominos. In 2016, Coolidge stated that she recorded a demo with her boyfriend, the band's drummer Jim Gordon, before they went to England to record with Clapton. Once they met with Clapton, Coolidge played the piece she composed for him and she gave him a cassette. Clapton, impressed by the piece, used it as part of the song in the coda section which she found out by hearing the song over the PA system a year later. She tried to contact Clapton, but was told by his manager Robert Stigwood, "What are you gonna do? You’re a girl. You don't have money to fight this." She hasn't heard from Clapton himself but believes he is aware of the situation.

Though only Gordon has been officially credited with this part, the band's keyboardist Bobby Whitlock claimed: Jim took that piano melody from his ex-girlfriend, Rita Coolidge. I know because in the Delaney & Bonnie days, I lived in John Garfield's old house in the Hollywood Hills and there was a guest house with an upright piano in it. Rita and Jim were up there in the guest house and invited me to join in on writing this song with them called "Time". Her sister Priscilla wound up recording it with her husband, Booker T. Jones (of Booker T. & the M.G.'s). Jim took the melody from Rita's song and didn't give her credit for writing it. Her boyfriend ripped her off. "Time" ended up on the 1973 album Chronicles by Booker T. and Priscilla.

Kris Kristofferson 

In November 1970, she met Kris Kristofferson at the Los Angeles airport when they were both catching the same flight to Tennessee. Instead of continuing to his intended destination in Nashville, he got off in Memphis with her. The two married in 1973, had a child in 1974, and recorded several duet albums, which sold well and earned the duo a Grammy Award for Best Country Performance by a Duo or Group with Vocal in 1974 for "From the Bottle to the Bottom", and in 1976 for "Lover Please".

Coolidge's greatest success on the pop charts came during 1977–1978 with four consecutive top 25 hits, remakes of Jackie Wilson's "(Your Love Keeps Lifting Me) Higher and Higher", Boz Scaggs' "We're All Alone", the Temptations' "The Way You Do The Things You Do", and Marcia Hines' "You". Coolidge and Kristofferson divorced in June 1980.

Later career 

In 1992, Coolidge sang joint lead vocals with Roger Waters on the title track of his album Amused to Death.

She also was among the first hosts on VH1, a U.S. cable network. In 2006, she recorded a standards album, And So Is Love.

Walela 

In 1997, Coolidge was one of the founding members of Walela, a Native American music trio, that also included her sister Priscilla and Priscilla's daughter Laura Satterfield. The trio released studio albums in 1997 (Walela) and 2000 (Unbearable Love), a live album and DVD (Live in Concert) in 2004 and a compilation album (The Best of Walela) in 2007.

Walela means hummingbird in Cherokee. Coolidge considered this group important, not only in honoring her Cherokee ancestors but also in bringing their culture to others. The trio performed at the 1996 Summer Olympics in Atlanta.

Books 
Her autobiography, Delta Lady: A Memoir, was published in April 2016.

Personal life

Relationships 
Coolidge had romantic liaisons with Stephen Stills and Graham Nash. Coolidge leaving Stills for Nash has been cited as a contributing factor behind the initial 1970 breakup of Crosby, Stills, Nash & Young. She was the "sweet little Indian girl" named "Raven" in the song "Cowboy Movie" on David Crosby's album If I Could Only Remember My Name.

Coolidge was also involved with Leon Russell and Joe Cocker. During the Mad Dogs & Englishmen tour, Coolidge's boyfriend at the time, Jim Gordon, assaulted her, resulting in a black eye for the rest of the tour. Coolidge ended the relationship and never spoke to him again. Gordon was later diagnosed with schizophrenia and convicted of murdering his mother.

Coolidge was married to Kris Kristofferson from 1973 to 1980. Their daughter and her only child, Casey Kristofferson (also a musician), was born in 1974. Their marriage deteriorated after she miscarried her second child in 1977. In her memoir, Delta Lady, Coolidge described her marriage to Kristofferson as volatile due to his alcoholism and infidelity. She revealed he was also emotionally abusive and would belittle her talent. When they divorced she did not ask him for anything. However, in 2016 Coolidge told People that she and Kristofferson still shared a bond.

Coolidge married Tatsuya Suda, a world leader in computer architecture research, on June 19, 2004, in the Cook Islands. Suda, a Japanese citizen, retired in 2010 after a long tenure as a professor at the Donald Bren School of Information and Computer Sciences (UC Irvine), when allegations of professional misconduct against him surfaced. In 2014, he pleaded guilty to a felony charge of receiving illegal payments. She divorced Suda in 2012. Coolidge had lived in Fallbrook, California, where she painted and exhibited her work until 2017.

In 2017 Coolidge rekindled a romantic relationship with Joe Hutto, a former college boyfriend. They married in 2018 and moved back to Tallahassee.

Family 
In October, 2014, Coolidge's sister, Priscilla, was murdered by her husband, Michael Siebert, in a murder-suicide. The pain of that loss was exacerbated when Siebert's ashes were delivered to Rita's home and she had to dispose of them.

Awards and nominations 

Coolidge was inducted into the Southern Museum of Music Hall of Fame in 2015.

Grammy Awards 
Coolidge has been nominated for three Grammy Awards, and has won two.
|-
| 1974
| "From The Bottle To The Bottom"
| Best Country Vocal Performance by a Duo or Group
| 
|-
| 1975
| "Loving Arms"
| Best Country Vocal Performance by a Duo or Group
| 
|-
| 1976
| "Lover Please"
| Best Country Vocal Performance by a Duo or Group
|

Discography

Studio albums

Compilation albums

Singles 

 A B-side of "Fever"
 B Charted as a double A-side in Australia backed with "I Don't Want to Talk About It"

References

External links 

 
 Rita Coolidge on A&M Records
 Records discography

1945 births
A&M Records artists
American country singer-songwriters
American women country singers
American people of Cherokee descent
American people of Scottish descent
American women pop singers
Attic Records (Canada) artists
Concord Records artists
Delaney & Bonnie & Friends members
Florida State University alumni
Grammy Award winners
Living people
Monument Records artists
Musicians from Jacksonville, Florida
People from Lafayette, Tennessee
People from Nashville, Tennessee
Singer-songwriters from Tennessee
Singer-songwriters from Florida
People from Fallbrook, California
Country musicians from Tennessee
Country musicians from Florida
VH1 people
21st-century American women
Singer-songwriters from California
Women who experienced pregnancy loss